Saint-Nicolas Church is located in Saint Cyprien neighbourhood on the west side of the Garonne River, just outside the old city walls of Toulouse.

Description 
Saint Nicolas is the patron saint of sailors and those who are afraid of sinking. He might have been frequently solicited in a neighbourhood that has known yearly flash flood, for instance, the 1875 significant one.

Its Tolosan style octagonal bell tower was rebuilt around 1300, copying those of Saint Sernin and Church of the Jacobins.

Gallery

Roman Catholic churches in Toulouse
History of Toulouse
Brick Gothic
Gothic architecture in France